Gless Peak is a peak,  high, standing  west-southwest of Cirque Peak, in the Millen Range, Victoria Land, Antarctica. This topographical feature was first mapped by the United States Geological Survey from surveys and U.S. Navy air photos, 1960–64, and was named by the Advisory Committee on Antarctic Names for Elmer E. Gless, a former biologist at Hallett Station, during the Summers of 1965, 1966, 1967 and 1968. The peak lies situated on the Pennell Coast, a portion of Antarctica lying between Cape Williams and Cape Adare.

References

Mountains of Victoria Land
Pennell Coast